The Pianist: Portrait of Stanley Addicks is an 1896 portrait by Thomas Eakins, Goodrich #278. The painting is in the permanent collection of the Indianapolis Museum of Art. 

Eakins also painted Addicks's wife, Weda Cook, several times, including for The Concert Singer.

Notes

References
 Goodrich, Lloyd. Thomas Eakins: His Life and Works. William Edwin Rudge Printing House. New York, 1933. Catalogue of Works. Pages 161–209.
 Hendricks, Gordon (1974).  The Life and Works of Thomas Eakins. New York: Grossman Publishers.

External links
 Indianapolis Museum of Art listing for the painting 
 Villa Painting 
 Collin County Criminal Defense Lawyer

Pianist
1896 paintings
Paintings in Indianapolis